Wye Hall is a historic house at 505 Wye Hall Drive in rural southern Queenstown, Queen Anne's County, Maryland.  It is located on the north side of the eastern point of Wye Island.  It is a handsome Georgian Revival house, built in 1936 to a design by Tilden, Register and Pepper, for businessman William Stillwell.  It is set on a series of landscaped terraces, at the location of the plantation mansion of American Founding Father and Governor of Maryland William Paca. William Paca is buried at the family cemetery there.  The Paca residence burned down in 1879.  The University of Maryland, College Park conducted archeological work there.

The property was listed on the National Register of Historic Places in 2015.

References

External links
 Aspen Wye Conference Center, The Aspen Institute
 Historic Houses - Wye Hall - Wye Island, Maryland Historical Society 
 Historic Houses - William Paca House - Queenstown, MD, Maryland Historical Society 

Houses completed in 1765
Houses completed in 1936
Plantations in Maryland
Houses in Queen Anne's County, Maryland
Archaeological sites in Queen Anne's County, Maryland
Georgian Revival architecture in Maryland
National Register of Historic Places in Queen Anne's County, Maryland
Houses on the National Register of Historic Places in Maryland
Burned houses in the United States
Buildings and structures demolished in 1879
1936 establishments in Maryland